Theodore is an English masculine given name and surname. It comes from the Greek name Θεόδωρος (Theodōros) meaning "God's gift" (from the Greek words Θεός, (theos) "God" and δώρον (dōron) "gift"). The name was popular among early Christians and was borne by several saints. 

Theodore as a surname may refer to:

José Théodore (born 1976), Canadian ice hockey goaltender 
Jon Theodore, (born 1973) American ex-drummer for The Mars Volta
Jordan Theodore (born 1989), American basketball player
Ouigi Theodore (born c.1975), American fashion designer
Patrick Theodore (born 1996), Australian professional soccer player
Shea Theodore (born 1995), Canadian ice hockey player
Stephen Theodore (born 1950), former Australian rules footballer
Ted Theodore (1884–1950), Australian politician

See also
 Theodore (disambiguation), listing of highly notable persons with the given name Theodore and variants
 Theodore (given name), etymology of the name and detailed listing of persons with the given name Theodore and variants

References

English-language surnames